Prince Emanuele may refer to:

 Prince Emanuele Filiberto, 2nd Duke of Aosta (1869–1931), eldest son of Amadeo I of Spain
 Prince Emanuele Filiberto of Venice and Piedmont (born 1972), member of the House of Savoy
 Prince Vittorio Emanuele of Naples (born 1937), last Crown Prince of Italy

See also

 Emanuele
 Prince (disambiguation)